Yi Pyong-do (April 28, 1896 – August 14, 1989) was one of the influential Korean historians but he was also associated with the Japanese view of Korean history.

Japanese collaboration controversy 
After the South Korean liberation from the Japan, there was a drive on the part of Korean historians to present a new history of Korea and it was called Han-guksa sillon. Yi Pyong-do was part of this initiative, which was viewed as new in name only because it inherited the colonialist racial perspective inherited from the Japanese scholarship.

Korean historians such as Cho Yun-jae, Son Chin-tae, and Yi In-yong, among other Chindan hakhoe historians followed another direction in their scholarship, which they also labeled "new" - the new nationalist historiography or sin-minjokjuui yoksahak. This group, specifically, excluded Yi Pyong-do due to his association with the colonial government, particularly the Chosenshi henshukai, which was generally viewed as an instrument used to distort Korean history by suppressing or delegitimizing important texts such as the Samguk yusa. Some sources, however, point out that the charge could be political because the purge of collaborators became part of the post-liberation Korean politics.

Yi Pyong-do, himself, addressed the controversy by stressing that he worked for the Chosenshi henshukai to prevent a Japanese distortion of Korean history, a position that echoed the same argument adopted by other historians identified with the Japanese colonial government.

Biography
He started working in Korean History Compilation Committee in 1927.
In 1934 he founded Jindan Institute.
From 1945 to 1962 he was Professor of Seoul Nation University.
From 1955 to 1982 he was Committee of Korean Nation History Editor.
In April 1960, he became the Minister of Education, but later resigned in August of that year.

Disciples
Lee Ki-baik, a disciple of Yi Pyong-do, is famous for his history book "The New History of Korea".
Ko Byeongik, Cha Hasun and Yi Kidong are also known as his disciples.

References

1896 births
1989 deaths
People from Yongin
Historians of Korea
Korean collaborators with Imperial Japan
Academic staff of Seoul National University
Government ministers of South Korea
South Korean Buddhists
Members of the National Academy of Sciences of the Republic of Korea